
Głubczyce County is a unit of territorial administration and local government (powiat) in Opole Voivodeship, south-western Poland, on the Czech border. It came into being on January 1, 1999, as a result of the Polish local government reforms passed in 1998.

As of 2019, its total population is 45,679, out of which the population of Głubczyce is 12,552, that of Kietrz is 6,005, that of Baborów is 2,905, and the rural population is 24,217.

Neighbouring counties
Głubczyce County is bordered by Prudnik County to the north, and Kędzierzyn-Koźle County and Racibórz County to the east. It also borders the Czech Republic to the south and west.

Administrative division
The county is subdivided into four gminas (three urban-rural and one rural). These are listed in the following table, in descending order of population.

Local Action Group
On the territory of the Głubczyce County is active Plateau of the Good Land Local Action Group.

Partner regions
Głubczyce County cooperates with:
 Budišov nad Budišovkou, Czech Republic
 Holzminden (district), Germany
 Úvalno, Czech Republic

See also 
Silesia Euroregion

Gallery

References

 
Land counties of Opole Voivodeship